Yaylapınar is a village in the Bayburt District, Bayburt Province, Turkey. Its population is 334 (2021).

Geography 
It is 31 km from the center of Bayburt.

Climate 
The climate of the village is in the area of influence of the Black Sea climate.

Population

Economy 
The economy of a village depends on agriculture and husbandry.

Infrastructure information 
In the village, there is no primary school but transportating education is benefited. The village has drinking water network, but there is no sewerage system. There is no PTT branch and PTT agency. There is no health centers and health posts. There is electricity and fixed telephone in the village.

References 

Villages in Bayburt District